The Cabinet of Jordan is led by the Prime Minister who is appointed by the King. The Prime Minister is then free to form his own cabinet which is responsible to the Chamber of Deputies on matters of general policy and can be forced to resign by a two-thirds vote of "no confidence" by that body or be dismissed by the King.

On 12 October 2020, a royal decree by King Abdullah II approved of Bisher Al-Khasawneh's Cabinet and was sworn in. The cabinet was reshuffled on 6 March 2021.

Current Cabinet 
The current Cabinet of Jordan (Council of Ministers) includes the following members:

 Bisher Al-Khasawneh (Chairman) as Prime Minister and Minister of Defence
 Tawfiq Kreishan as Deputy Prime Minister, Minister of Local Administration
 Ayman Safadi as Deputy Prime Minister and Minister of Foreign Affairs and Expatriates
 Khaled Musa Al Henefat as Minister of Agriculture
 Wajih Azaizeh as Minister for Political and Parliamentary Affairs
 Faisal Shboul as Minister of Government Communications
 Nasser Shraideh as Deputy Prime Minister for Economic Affairs and Minister of State for Public Sector Modernisation
 Zeina Toukan as Minister of Planning and International Cooperation
 Ahmad Maher Abul Samen as Minister of Public Works and Housing and Minister of Transport
 Nayef Al Fayez as Minister of Tourism and Antiquities
 Ibrahim Jazi as Minister of State for Prime Ministry Affairs
 Nancy Namrouqa as Minister of State for Legal Affairs
 Ahmad Nouri Ziadat as Minister of Justice
 Yousef Shamali as Minister of Industry, Trade, and Supply and Minister of Labour
 Saleh Ali Al-Kharabsheh as Minister of Energy and Mineral Resources
 Mohamad Al Ississ as Minister of Finance
 Mohammad Khalayleh as Minister of Awqaf and Islamic Affairs
 Haifa Najjar as Minister of Culture
 Muawieh Radaideh as Minister of Environment
 Wafaa Bani Mustafa as Minister of Social Development
 Azmi Mahafzah as Minister of Education and Minister of Higher Education and Scientific Research
 Mazin Abdellah Hilal Al Farrayeh as Minister of Interior
 Firas Al-Hawari as Minister of Health
 Mohammed Al Najjar as Minister of Water and Irrigation
 Mohammad Salameh Al Nabulsi as Minister of Youth
 Ahmad Hanandeh as Minister of Digital Economy and Entrepreneurship
 Kholoud Saqqaf as Minister of Investment

See also 

Hani Al-Mulki's first cabinet
Hani Al-Mulki's second cabinet
Omar Razzaz's Cabinet
Bisher Al-Khasawneh's Cabinet

References

Jordan
Government of Jordan